Sounds Like This is the third studio album by singer/songwriter Eric Hutchinson. It was released on May 20, 2008. In the United States, the album is available as a single release in most retail and online stores. The album began at No. 1 on Billboards Heatseekers chart in September 2007. This was helped greatly by a recommendation from blogger Perez Hilton.

Track listing

Personnel
Eric Hutchinson – vocals, piano, acoustic guitar, keyboards, Moog bass, percussion
Will Golden – drum programming, vibes, xylophone, guitar, harmonium, B-3, percussion
Chris Chaney – bass
Gary Novak – drums
Deron Johnson – Wurlitzer, synths, piano solo on "Food Chain"
Jason Gonzalez – electric guitars, lap steel guitar
Theo Deacon – percussion
Jamie Wollam – drums on "All Over Now"
Jerome Deupree – drums on "It Hasn't Been Long Enough"
Billy Hulting – congas on "Outside Villanova" and "You've Got You"
Paul Pate – saxophone
Mike Armstrong – saxophone, solo on "It Hasn't Been Long Enough"
Paul Kolderie – electric sitar on "It Hasn't Been Long Enough"
Fil Kroengold – clavinet and Wurlitzer on "All Over Now"
Dave Yaden – clavinet on "Outside Villanova" and "Rock and Roll"
The Oakwoods Clappers – Todd Strauss-Schulson, Steve Basilone, Dan Levy, James Kirkland, Jen Zaborowski and Robert Cappadona

Charts

References

External links
 Official Eric Hutchinson site
 Official Eric Hutchinson Myspace page
 Official Youtube page
 Official Imeem page

2008 albums
Warner Music Group albums